Tanganya orthohantavirus (TGNV) is a viral isolate detected in tissue samples from Crocidura douceti (musk shrew). The putative host shrews were captured near the village of Tanganya, Guinea, in January 2004.

References 

Hantaviridae